The Fed Cup is an annual tournament between national teams in women's tennis. The four losing teams in the World Group first round ties and four winners of the World Group II ties competed in the World Group Play-offs.

At the time of the ties taking place, it was expected that the winners would secure a place in the World Group for 2020, while the losers would be relegated to World Group II, in accordance with the existing competition structure.

However, the restructuring of the Fed Cup for 2020 announced on 27 June 2019 stipulated that all eight nations which participated in the World Group Play-offs would enter into the 2020 Fed Cup Qualifiers. Consequently, the results of the 2019 World Group Play-off ties had no bearing on promotion or relegation for the following year.

Seeding 
The seeding was announced on 11 February 2019.

<onlyinclude>

Seeds: 

Remaining nations:

Czech Republic vs. Canada

United States vs. Switzerland

Latvia vs. Germany

Belgium vs. Spain

References

External links 
Fed Cup website

World Group I Play-offs